The A-1 lifeboat was a powered lifeboat that was made to be dropped by fixed-wing aircraft into water to aid in air-sea rescue operations. The sturdy airborne lifeboat was to be carried by a heavy bomber specially modified to handle the external load of the lifeboat. The A-1 lifeboat was intended to be dropped by parachute during Dumbo missions to land within reach of the survivors of an accident on the ocean, specifically airmen survivors of an emergency water landing.

Design
The first airborne lifeboat was designed in the United Kingdom by Uffa Fox in 1943 and used from February 1943. In the United States, Andrew Higgins evaluated the Fox boat and found it too weak to survive mishap in emergency operations. In November 1943, Higgins assigned engineers from his company to make a sturdier version with two air-cooled engines. Intended to be dropped by modified Boeing B-17 Flying Fortresses, it was ready for production in early 1944.

The yellow-painted vessel was supplied with enough food, water and clothing for 12 survivors to last for about 20 days in the ocean. It was provided with sails kept relatively small so that inexpert operators could use them. A "Gibson Girl" survival radio was aboard with an antenna to be lifted up with a kite.

Higgins also produced a smaller  version of the A-1 for the US Coast Guard that could be dropped by PBY Catalinas. This version was half the weight of the A-1. Unlike the larger version for the USAAF, the smaller Higgins air dropped lifeboat was designed to rescue only eight or fewer persons. While a November 1945 Popular Mechanics article states it was in USCG service there are few public references to this smaller version of the A-1.

Operations
Precisely as the aircraft passed directly over the rescue target the boat was to be released. The boat dropped free for a short distance, then static lines attached to the aircraft's bomb bay catwalk drew taut, pulling out three  parachutes of a standard U.S. Army design. In a manner similar to Fox's airborne lifeboat, upon contact with seawater, rocket-projected lines were automatically sent out  to each side to make it easier for survivors to reach the Higgins lifeboat. The parachutes settled into the water to create a sea anchor holding the boat steady while survivors worked to reach it. Inside the boat, the crew of the aircraft that dropped the lifeboat would have placed a map giving the approximate position of the boat and a recommended compass setting to take in order to facilitate rescue.

In the evening of March 30, a PBY Catalina landed in six-foot (2 m) swells to save the pilot of a downed P-51 Mustang, but one of the Catalina's engines lost its oil in the process, rendering the flying boat unable to take off. Darkness, distance, and poor visibility prevented the Catalina men from making contact with the Mustang pilot who drifted in a raft and was eventually taken prisoner of war. The next morning, a Vickers Warwick located the Catalina and dropped a Fox-designed airborne lifeboat nearby, but after being retrieved the lifeboat began to break up from repeatedly smashing against the Catalina in the increasingly heavy seas.

Instead, the six aircrew lashed three of their own inflatable rubber dinghies together and abandoned the aircraft in ten-foot (3 m) swells. Another Warwick dropped another Fox airborne lifeboat some distance away, but its parachute didn't open and it was destroyed upon striking the water. As it hit the water, one of the lifeboat's tethering rocket lines snaked out over the junction of two of the dinghies, making an ideal shot. The six airmen transferred to the Higgins lifeboat where they huddled down and waited for three days in the worst North Sea storm of 1945 before two more Fox airborne boats were dropped with gasoline and supplies on April 3, the lifeboats either swamping or breaking up upon hitting the water. On April 4 in continuing rough seas, the airmen were picked up by two Rescue Motor Launch (RML) boats, and the Higgins A-1 lifeboat, unable to be towed, was intentionally sunk by gunfire.

In the last eight months of World War II, Dumbo operations complemented simultaneous United States Army Air Forces heavy bombing operations against Japanese targets. On any one large-scale bombing mission carried out by Boeing B-29 Superfortresses, at least three submarines were posted along the air route, and Dumbo aircraft sent to patrol the distant waters where they searched the water's surface and listened for emergency radio transmissions from distressed aircraft. At the final bombing mission on August 14, 1945, 9 land-based Dumbos and 21 flying boats covered a surface and sub-surface force of 14 submarines and 5 rescue ships.

Coast Guard
The United States Coast Guard (USCG) operated Dumbo flights along the West Coast in the early 1950s, using the PB-1G, a B-17 variant. Such a flight is depicted briefly in the 1954 film The High and the Mighty. Further Dumbo flights were conducted jointly by the USCG and the U.S. Navy during the Korean War.

The A-1 lifeboat was joined and then succeeded by the A-3 lifeboat from 1947. The A-3 lifeboat was used until the mid-1950s, after which winch equipped helicopters had become commonplace enough to be used to lift survivors instead of dropping a lifeboat to them.

References
Notes

Bibliography
 Crocker, Mel. Black Cats and Dumbos: WW II's Fighting PBYs. Crocker Media Expressions, 2002. .
 Hardwick, Jack; Ed Schnepf. The Making of the Great Aviation Films. General Aviation Series, Volume 2. Challenge Publications, 1989.
 Lloyd, Alwyn T. B-17 Flying Fortress in Detail and Scale, Volume 11: Derivatives, part 2. Fallbrook, California: Aero Publishers, 1983. 
 Morison, Samuel Eliot. History of United States Naval Operations in World War II: The struggle for Guadalcanal, August 1942 – February 1943. University of Illinois Press, 2001. 
 Ostrom, Thomas P. The United States Coast Guard, 1790 to the present: a history. Elderberry Press, Inc., 2004. 
 Strahan, Jerry E. Andrew Jackson Higgins and the Boats That Won World War II. LSU Press, 1998.

External links
Photographic sequence of a Higgins lifeboat airdrop test in 1951
USCG PB-1G in flight, carrying the A-1 lifeboat

Lifeboats
Rescue equipment
Rescue aviation